Bernard Ford, MBE, (born in Birmingham) is an English former ice dancer. With partner Diane Towler, he is a four-time (1966–1969) World, European, and British champion. He is also a World Professional ice dancing champion. He later became a coach and choreographer.

Skating career 
Ford competed with Diane Towler. They were coached by Gladys Hogg in London, England at Queens Ice Dance Club.

Towler / Ford debuted at the World Championships in 1964, finishing 13th. In 1965, they finished just off the podium in 4th. Towler / Ford won gold at the 1966 European Championships and went on to win their first World title. They would win the World and European titles for four consecutive seasons. At the 1968 Olympics, Towler / Ford skated in a demonstration event for ice dancing, winning the gold medal. Ice dancing became an official part of the Winter Olympics in 1976.

The achievements of Towler and Ford earned them the appointment of Members of the Order of the British Empire (MBE) by Queen Elizabeth II, as well as a spot in the World Figure Skating Hall of Fame in 1993.

Birmingham Ice Skating Sound of Music Dance Gala Team April 1969.

Click on the link below to see photo.

Coaching career 
Ford immigrated to Ontario, Canada in 1971 and coached numerous ice dance teams to national titles and international acclaim, most notably 1986 World bronze medalists Tracy Wilson / Rob McCall. His coaching success with Wilson / McCall earned him the Petro-Canada Coaching Excellence Award and the Longines-Wittnauer Coaching Excellence Award.

In 1986, Ford co-founded the York Region Skating Academy (YRSA) in Richmond Hill, Ontario. In 1989 at the YRSA, Ford invented the Cha-Cha Congelado, with assistance from coach Kelly Johnson and ice dance team Laurie Palmer / Steven Belanger. The Cha-Cha Congelado became an International Skating Union pattern dance. In 1999 the Town of Richmond Hill recognised Ford with an induction into the Richmond Hill Sports Hall of Fame. 
 
In 1994, Ford took a coaching position in Seattle, Washington, USA, where he produced national champions and international competitors as well as coaching ice dance teams from Australia and Japan to World Championship competition.

Ford returned to Canada in 2003 and continues to coach ice dance teams to the national and international level.

Over the years he has acted as a consultant to Skate Canada, United States Figure Skating, Professional Skaters Association and the ISU ice dance technical committee. He has acted as an NCCP coaching course facilitator and conducted officials and coach teaching and training seminars for national sport organisations across the world.

In January 2007, Skate Canada inducted Ford into the Skate Canada Hall of Fame.

Personal life 
Ford was educated at the prestigious King Edward VI Grammar School in Aston, Birmingham. (King Edwards also produced such writers as J.R.R. Tolkien – "The Hobbit" & "The Lord of the Rings" ).

Ford currently resides in Calgary, Alberta with his wife and son.

Results
(with Diane Towler)

References

External links

 British ice dancing legend brings extensive knowledge to Calgary figure skating scene
 Skate Guard Interview with Bernard Ford
 Skatabase: 1960–1969 Worlds: Ice Dancing Results
 Skatabase: 1960–1969 Europeans: Ice Dancing Results
 Skatabase: 1980–1989 Worlds: Ice Dancing Results

People educated at King Edward VI Aston School
Living people
English male ice dancers
British figure skating coaches
Canadian figure skating coaches
Ford, Bernard
Ford, Bernard
Ford, Bernard
Dancing on Ice
World Figure Skating Championships medalists
European Figure Skating Championships medalists
Year of birth missing (living people)